The Nicholas Haring House is a historical house located in Rockleigh, Bergen County, New Jersey, United States. The house was built in 1805 by John A. Haring. The house was inherited by Nicholas J. Haring and remained in his family until 1969. It is a well-preserved example of 19th-century Dutch Colonial architecture. The house was added to the National Register of Historic Places on January 10, 1983.

See also 

 National Register of Historic Places listings in Bergen County, New Jersey

References

Houses on the National Register of Historic Places in New Jersey
Houses in Bergen County, New Jersey
National Register of Historic Places in Bergen County, New Jersey
Rockleigh, New Jersey
1805 establishments in New Jersey
New Jersey Register of Historic Places